Galatga  is a village in the southern state of Karnataka, India. It is in the  Nipani Taluk of Belgaum district in Karnataka.

Demographics
At the 2001 India census, Galatga had a population of 15,000 with 7800 males and 7200 females.

See also
 Belgaum
 Districts of Karnataka

References

Villages in Belagavi district